José María Téllez-Girón y Benavides (Madrid, 25 May 1685 – 18 May 1733), 7th Duke of Osuna, 7th Marquess of Peñafiel, 11th Count of Ureña, was a Spanish military, diplomat and a Grandee of Spain.

Biography 
He was the second surviving son of Gaspar Téllez-Girón, 5th Duke de Osuna, and his second wife, Ana Antonia de Benavides Carrillo y Toledo, Marquise of Caracena and Countess of Pinto. When his elder brother died without sons in 1716, he became VII Duke of Osuna, after a dispute with his niece María Domínguez Téllez Girón y Velasco, Marquise de Berlanga.

In 1704 he attended the Siege of Gibraltar with his brother. In the plans for the 1707 Battle of Almansa, he is already mentioned as mariscal de campo. By order of his general, he brought to Madrid 100 banners taken from the enemy, which King Philip V ordered it to be placed in the Basilica of Atocha. He was also the author of the account of the Battle of Almansa. On 10 November 1707, he participated in the Battle of Lérida, in which he was wounded.

On 5 June 1719, he was appointed Lieutenant General and on 30 September 1721 he was sent to Versailles as extraordinary ambassador to ask for the hand of Princess Louise Élisabeth d'Orléans for Infante Luis. As a result of his efforts, the French King Luis XV honored him by conferring the necklace of the Order of the Holy Spirit on 22 January 1722. 
At the end of 1722 he was appointed head of the delegation to accompany the French princess Philippine Élisabeth d'Orléans, who was going to marry Infante Carlos. On 25 January 1723, he delivered to the French Monarch the jewel that the King of Spain had sent him, and the next day he departed with the Princess, whom he accompanied to Buitrago and presented in Fuencarral on 16 February. 

He was also captain of the 1st company of the Life Guards in the service of Felipe V, Gentilhombre de cámara con ejercicio and figured among the Illustrious Sons of Madrid presented by José Antonio Álvarez Baena.

Marriage and children 
He married on 21 September 1721, with Francisca Bibiana, 6th daughter of Manuel Pérez de Guzmán, 12th Duke of Medina Sidonia.
They had 2 children :
 María Faustina Manuel Téllez-Girón (born 1724), married Francisco Alfonso Pimentel y Borja
Pedro Téllez-Girón (1728-1787), his successor, had issue.

Sources 
Real Academia de la Historia.

1685 births
1733 deaths
House of Osuna
Téllez-Girón family
111
107
107
Spanish diplomats
Grandees of Spain